DT-PACE refers to a chemotherapy regimen for multiple myeloma consisting of  Dexamethasone, Thalidomide, Cisplatin or Platinol, Adriamycin or doxorubicin, Cyclophosphamide, and Etoposide.

References

External links
 DT-PACE

Chemotherapy regimens used in multiple myeloma